Khuzestan Province (also spelled Xuzestan;  Ostān-e Xūzestān) is one of the 31 provinces of Iran. It is in the southwest of the country, bordering Iraq and the Persian Gulf. Since 2014, it has been part of Iran's Region 4.

At the 2006 National Census, Khuzestan province had a population of 4,192,598 in 862,491 households. The following census in 2011 counted 4,531,720 people in 1,112,664 households. At the most recent census conducted in 2016, the province had a population of 4,710,509 in 1,280,645 households.

Historically, one of the most important regions of the Ancient Near East, Khuzestan is what historians refer to as ancient Elam, whose capital was in Susa. The Achaemenid Old Persian term for Elam was Hujiyā when they conquered it from the Elamites, which is present in the modern name. Khuzestan, meaning "the Land of the Khuz", refers to the original inhabitants of this province, the "Susian" people (Old Persian "Huza" or Huja, as in the inscription on the tomb of Darius the Great at Naqsh-e Rostam). They are the Shushan of the Hebrew sources where they are recorded as "Hauja" or "Huja". In Middle Persian, the term evolves into "Khuz" and "Kuzi". The pre-Islamic Partho-Sasanian inscriptions gives the name of the province as Khwuzestan.

The seat of the province has for most of its history been in the northern reaches of the land, first at Susa Shush) and then at Shushtar. During a short spell in the Sasanian era, the capital of the province was moved to its geographical center, where the river town of Hormuz-Ardasher, founded over the foundation of the ancient Hoorpahir by Ardashir I, the founder of the Sasanian Dynasty in the 3rd century CE. This town is now known as Ahvaz. However, later in the Sasanian time and throughout the Islamic era, the provincial seat returned and stayed at Shushtar, until the late Qajar period. With the increase in the international sea commerce, arriving on the shores of Khuzistan, Ahvaz became a more suitable location for the provincial capital. The River Karun is navigable all the way to Ahvaz (above which, it flows through rapids). The town was thus refurbished by the order of the Qajar king, Naser al-Din Shah and renamed after him, Nâseri. Shushtar quickly declined, while Ahvaz/Nâseri prospered to the present day.

Khuzestan is known for its ethnic diversity; the population of Khuzestan consists of Lurs, Iranian Arabs, Qashqai people, Afshars, indigenous Persians (Dezfuli-Shushtari, Behbahani), Kurds and Iranian Armenians. Khuzestan's population is predominantly Shia Muslim, but there are small Christian, Jewish, Sunni and Mandean minorities. Half of Khuzestan's population is Lur.

From the 1920s to the early 2020s, tensions on religious and ethnic grounds have often resulted in violence and attempted separatism, including an insurgency in 1979, unrest in 2005, bombings in 2005–06 and protests in 2011, which drew much criticism of Iran by international human rights organizations, however, the conflict came to an end. In 1980, the region was invaded by Ba'athist Iraq, leading to the Iran–Iraq War. Currently, Khuzestan has 18 representatives in Iran's parliament, the Majlis. Meanwhile, it has six representatives in the Assembly of Experts, including Ayatollahs Mousavi Jazayeri, Ka'bi, Heidari, Farhani, Shafi'i, and Ahmadi.

Etymology 

The name Khuzestan means "The Land of the Khuzi", and refers to the original inhabitants of this province, the "Susian" people (Old Persian "Huza", Middle Persian "Khuzi" or "Husa" (the Shushan of the Hebrew sources). The name of the city of Ahvaz also has the same origin as the name Khuzestan, being an Arabic broken plural from the compound name, "Suq al-Ahvaz" (Market of the Huzis)--the medieval name of the town, that replaced the Sasanian Persian name of the pre-Islamic times.

The entire province was still known as "the Khudhi" or "the Khooji" until the reign of the Safavid king Tahmasp I (r. 1524–1576) and in general the course of the 16th century. The southern half of the province—south, southwest of the Ahwaz Ridge, had come by the 17th century to be known—at least to the imperial Safavid chancery as Arabistan. The contemporaneous history, the Alamara-i Abbasi by Iskandar Beg Munshi, written during the reign of king Abbas I (r. 1588–1629), regularly refers to the southern part of Khuzestan as "Arabistan". The northern half continued to be called Khuzestan. In 1925, the entire province regained the old name and the term Arabistan was dropped.

There is also a very old folk etymology which maintains the word "khouz" stands for sugar and "Khouzi" for people who make raw sugar. The province has been a cane sugar-producing area since the late Sassanian times, such as the sugar cane fields of the Dez River side in Dezful. Khuzhestan has been the land of Khouzhies who cultivate sugar cane even today in Haft Tepe.

The name of the province in Syriac is Beth Huzaye.

History

Antiquity 
 
The province of Khuzestan is one of the centres of ancient civilization, and one of the most important regions of the Ancient Near East, based around Susa. The first large scale empire based here was that of the powerful 4th millennium BC Elamites.

Archeological ruins verify the entire province of Khuzestan to be home to the Elamite civilization, a non-Semitic, and non-Indo-European-speaking kingdom, and
"the earliest civilization of Persia". The name Khuzestan is derived from the Elamite (ʰŪvja), likely pronounced /xuʒa/, later Middle Persian Hūzīg, Arabic al-Xūzīya.

In fact, in the words of Elton L. Daniel, the Elamites were "the founders of the first 'Iranian' empire in the geographic sense." Hence the central geopolitical significance of Khuzestan, the seat of Iran's first empire.

In 640 BC, the Elamites were defeated by Ashurbanipal, coming under the rule of the Assyrians who brought destruction upon Susa and Chogha Zanbil. But in 538 BC, Cyrus the Great was able to re-conquer the Elamite lands after nearly 80 years of Median rule. The city of Susa was then proclaimed as one of the Achaemenid capitals. Darius the Great then erected a grand palace known as Apadana there in 521 BC. But this astonishing period of glory and splendor of the Achaemenian dynasty came to an end by the conquests of Alexander of Macedon. The Susa weddings was arranged by Alexander in 324 BC in Susa, where mass weddings took place between the Persians and the Macedonians. After Alexander, the Seleucid dynasty came to rule the area.

As the Seleucid dynasty weakened, Mehrdad I the Parthian (171–137 BC), gained ascendency over the region. During the Sassanid dynasty this area thrived tremendously and flourished, and this dynasty was responsible for the many constructions that were erected in Ahvaz, Shushtar, and the north of Andimeshk.

During the early years of the reign of Shapur II (AD 309 or 310–379), Arabs crossed the Persian Gulf from Bahrain to "Ardashir-Khora" of Fars and raided the interior. In retaliation, Shapur II led an expedition through Bahrain, defeated the combined forces of the Arab tribes of "Taghleb", "Bakr bin Wael", and "Abd Al-Qays" and advanced temporarily into Yamama in central Najd. The Sassanids resettled these tribes in Kerman and Ahvaz. Arabs named Shapur II, as "Shabur Dhul-aktāf" after this battle.

The existence of prominent scientific and cultural centers such as Academy of Gundishapur which gathered distinguished medical scientists from Egypt, the Byzantine Empire, and Rome, shows the importance and prosperity of this region during this era. The Jondi-Shapur Medical School was founded by the order of Shapur I. It was repaired and restored by Shapur II (a.k.a. Zol-Aktaf: "The Possessor of Shoulder Blades") and was completed and expanded during the reign of Anushirvan.

Muslim conquest of Khuzestan 

The Muslim conquest of Khuzestan took place in 639 AD under the command of Abu Musa al-Ash'ari from Basra, who drove the Persian satrap Hormuzan out of Ahvaz. Susa later fell, so Hormuzan fled to Shushtar. There his forces were besieged by Abu Musa for 18 months. Shushtar finally fell in 642 AD; the Khuzistan Chronicle records that an unknown Arab, living in the city, befriended a man in the army, and dug tunnels through the wall in return for a third of the spoil. The Basrans purged the Nestorians—the Exegete of the city and the Bishop of Hormizd, and all their students—but kept Hormuzan alive.

There followed the conquests of Gundeshapur and of many other districts along the Tigris. The Battle of Nahāvand finally secured Khuzestan for the Muslim armies.

During the Muslim conquest the Sassanids were allied with non-Muslim Arab tribes, which implies that those wars were religious, rather than national. For instance in 633–634, Khaled ibn Walid leader of the Muslim Army, defeated a force of the Sassanids' Arab auxiliaries from the tribes of Bakr, 'Ejl, Taghleb and Namer at 'Ayn Al-Tamr.

The Muslim settlements by military garrisons in southern Iran was soon followed by other types of expansion. Some families, for example, took the opportunity to gain control of private estates. Like the rest of Iran, the Muslim conquest thus brought Khuzestan under the rule of the Arabs of the Umayyad and Abbasid Caliphates, until Ya'qub bin Laith as-Saffar, from southeastern Iran, raised the flag of independence once more, and ultimately regained control over Khuzestan, among other parts of Iran, founding the short-lived Saffarid dynasty. From that point on, Iranian dynasties would continue to rule the region in succession as an important part of Iran.

In the Umayyad period, large groups of nomads from the Hanifa, Banu Tamim, and Abd al-Qays tribes crossed the Persian Gulf and occupied some of the richest Basran territories around Ahvaz and in Fars during the Second Fitna in 661–665 / 680–684 AD.

During the Abbasid period, in the second half of the 10th century, the Assad tribe, taking advantage of quarrels under the Buwayhids, penetrated into Khuzestan, where a group of Tamim had been living since pre-Islamic times. However, following the fall of the Abbasid dynasty, the flow of Arab immigrants into Persia gradually diminished, but it nonetheless continued. In the latter part of the 16th century, the Bani Kaab (pronounced Chaub in the local Gulf dialect), from Kuwait, settled in Khuzestan. And during the succeeding centuries, more Arab tribes moved from southern Iraq to Khuzestan.

Qajar period
According to C.E. Bosworth in Encyclopædia Iranica, under the Qajar dynasty "the province was known, as in Safavid times, as Arabistan, and during the Qajar period was administratively a governor-generalate." Half of Khuzestan was not known as Arabistan. Khuzestan's northern, more populous parts, with the capital at Shushtar, retained the old name, but also occasionally was incorporated into the district of the Greater Lur due to the large Bakhtiari population in half of Khuzestan.

In 1856, in the course of the Anglo-Persian War over the city of Herat, the British naval forces sailed up the Karun river all the way to Ahvaz. However, in the settlement that followed, they evacuated the province. Some tribal forces, such as those led by Sheikh Jabir al-Kaabi, the Sheikh of Mohammerah, fared better in opposing the invading British forces than those dispatched by the central government, which was quite feeble. But, the point of the invasion of the province and other coastal regions of southern Persia/Iran were to force the evacuation of Herat by the Persians and not the permanent occupation of these regions.

Pahlavi era

In the two decades before 1925, although nominally part of Persian territory, the western part of Khuzestan functioned for many years effectively as an autonomous emirate known as "Arabistan". The eastern part of Khuzestan was governed by Bakhtiari khans. Following Sheikh Khazal's rebellion, the western part of Khuzestan's emirate was dissolved by Reza Shah government in 1925, along with other autonomous regions of Persia, in a bid to centralize the state. In response Sheikh Khaz'al of Muhammerah initiated a rebellion, which was quickly crushed by the newly installed Pahlavi dynasty with minimal casualties. A low level conflict between the central Iranian government and the Arab nationalists of the province continued since.

The name of  'Khuzistan' came to be applied to the entire territory by 1936. Over the next decades of the Pahlavi rule, the province of Khuzestan remained relatively quiet, gaining to hold an important economic and defensive strategic position.

Islamic Republic

After the revolution
With the Iranian Revolution taking place in early 1979, local rebellions swept the country, with Khuzestan being no exception. In April 1979, an uprising broke out in the province, led by the Arab separatist group Arab Political and Cultural Organisation (APCO), seeking to gain independence from the new theocratic rule.

The Iranian Embassy siege of 1980 in London was initiated by an Arab separatist group as an aftermath response to the regional crackdown in Khuzestan, after the 1979 uprising. Initially it emerged the terrorists wanted autonomy for Khuzestan; later they demanded the release of 91 of their comrades held in Iranian jails.
The group which claimed responsibility for the siege the Arab Popular Movement in Arabistan (See Arab separatism in Khuzestan) gave a number of press conferences in the following months, referring to what it described as "the racist rule of Khomeini". It threatened further international action as part of its campaign to gain self-rule for Khuzestan. But its links with Baghdad served to undermine its argument that it was a purely Iranian opposition group; there were allegations that it was backed by Iran's regional rival, Iraq. Their leader ("Salim" - Awn Ali Mohammed) along with four other members of the group were killed and the fifth member, Fowzi Badavi Nejad, was sentenced to life imprisonment.

Iran–Iraq war
During the Iran–Iraq War, Khuzestan was the focus of the Iraqi invasion of Iran, leading to the flight of thousands of the province's residents. As a result, Khuzestan suffered the heaviest damage of all Iranian provinces during the war. Iraq's President Saddam Hussein felt confident that the Arab population of the Khuzestan would react enthusiastically to the prospect of union with Iraq. However, resistance to the invasion was fierce, stalling the Iraqi military's advance, and ultimately opening a window of opportunity for an Iranian counter-offensive.

What used to be Iran's largest refinery at Abadan was destroyed, never to fully recover. Many of the famous nakhlestans (palm groves) were annihilated, cities were destroyed, historical sites were demolished, and nearly half the province captured by the invading Iraqi army. This created a mass exodus into other provinces that did not have the logistical capability of taking in such a large number of refugees.

However, by 1982, Iranian forces managed to push Iraqi forces out of Iran. The Battle of Khorramshahr (one of Khuzestan's largest cities and the most important Iranian port prior to the war) was a turning point in the war, and is officially celebrated every year in Iran.

The city of Khorramshahr was almost completely destroyed as a result of the scorched earth policy ordered by Iraq's leader, Saddam Hussein. However, Iranian forces were able to prevent the Iraqis from attempting to spread the execution of this policy to other major urban centres.

2005–present
In 2005, Ahvaz witnessed a number of terrorist attacks, which came following the violent Ahvaz riots. The first bombing came ahead of the presidential election on 12 June 2005. In 2011, another wave of protests by Arab tribes occurred mostly in the urban area of Ahvaz. Before the Iran–Iraq War of the 1980s, the Arabs of Khuzestan mostly resided in the rural regions along the Karkhe and Karun rivers in the southwest of the province and the number living in cities was very limited because the Arab tribes were still following a nomadic lifestyle. But after the end of the war, most of the refuged Arabs were relocated by the government to the urban centres and smaller towns. This conversion of lifestyle directly from nomadic to city life caused many problems and conflicts in the structure of their societies and ultimately has led to some unrest. An unfinished building collapsed in Khuzestan provice in June 2022.  It was reported that thirteen people were arrested over the collapse. The incident also caused demonstrations in the region.

Geography and climate 
The province of Khuzestan can be basically divided into two regions; the rolling hills and mountainous regions north of the Ahwaz Ridge, and the plains and marsh lands to its south. The area is irrigated by the Karoun, Karkheh, Jarahi and Maroun rivers. The northern section maintains a non-Persian Bakhtiari minority, while the southern section always had diverse minority groups known as Khuzis. Since the 1940s, a flood of job seekers from all over Iran to the oil and commerce centers on the Persian Gulf Coast has made the region more Persian-speaking. Presently, Khuzestan still maintains its diverse group, but does have Arabs, Persians, Bakhtiari and ethnic Qashqais and Lors.

Khuzestan has great potential for agricultural expansion, which is almost unrivaled by the country's other provinces. Large and permanent rivers flow over the entire territory contributing to the fertility of the land. Karun, Iran's most effluent river, 850 kilometers long, flows into the Persian Gulf through this province. The agricultural potential of most of these rivers, however, and particularly in their lower reaches, is hampered by the fact that their waters carry salt, the amount of which increases as the rivers flow away from the source mountains and hills. In case of the Karun, a single tributary river, Rud-i Shur ("Salty River") that flows into the Karun above Shushtar contributes most of the salt that the river carries. As such, the freshness of the Karun waters could be greatly enhanced if the Rud-i Shur could be diverted away from the Karun. The same applies to the Jarahi and Karkheh in their lower reaches. Only the Marun is exempt from this.

The climate of Khuzestan is generally very hot and occasionally humid, particularly in the south, while winters can be cold and dry. Summertime temperatures routinely exceed  almost daily and in the winter it can drop below freezing, with occasional snowfall, all the way south to Ahvaz. Khuzestan is possibly one of the hottest places on earth with maximum temperature in summer soaring up to  degrees Celsius at 2 metres height. Satellite imagery has shown that in spite of this fact it is still not the hottest place in Iran, which lies to the east and can be found in Dasht-e Lut. Reliable measurements in the city range from −5 to 53 °C (23 to 127 °F).
Khuzestan has desert conditions and experiences many sandstorms.

Administrative divisions

Cities 

According to the 2016 census, 3,554,205 people (over 75% of the population of Khuzestan province) live in the following cities: Abadan 231,476, Abezhdan 1,673, Abu Homeyzeh 5,506, Aghajari 11,912, Ahvaz 1,184,788, Alvan 6,860, Andimeshk 135,116, Arvandkenar 11,173, Azadi 4,957, Bagh-e Malek 26,343, Bandar-e Emam Khomeyni 78,353, Bandar-e Mahshahr 162,797, Behbahan 122,604, Bidrubeh 2,386, Bostan 8,476, Cham Golak 5,446, Chamran 33,505, Chavibdeh 7,906, Choghamish 2,013, Darkhoveyn 5,655, Dehdez 5,490, Dezful 264,709, Elhayi 7,651, Fath Olmobin 2,973, Golgir 1,089, Gotvand 24,216, Guriyeh 2,890, Haftkel 15,802, Hamidiyeh 22,057, Hamzeh 6,091, Hendijan 29,015, Horr 9,177, Hoseyniyeh 1,821, Hosseinabad 8,833, Hoveyzeh 19,481, Izeh 119,399, Jannat Makan 5,360, Jayezan 2,357, Khanafereh 3,853, Khorramshahr 133,097, Kut-e Abdollah 56,252, Kut-e Seyyed Naim 4,541, Lali 18,473, Mansuriyeh 5,441, Masjed Soleyman 100,497, Meydavud 3,513, Mianrud 10,110, Minushahr 2,231, Mollasani 17,337, Moshrageh 2,095, Omidiyeh 67,427, Qaleh Tall 10,698, Qaleh-ye Khvajeh 2,408, Rafi 3,797, Ramhormoz 74,285, Ramshir 25,009, Safiabad 9,879, Saland 2,560, Saleh Shahr 7,309, Sardarabad 5,240, Sardasht 6,912, Seydun 7,650, Shadegan 41,733, Shahr-e Emam 11,393, Shamsabad 10,858, Sharafat 11,757, Sheyban 36,374, Shush 77,148, Shushtar 101,878, Siah Mansur 5,406, Somaleh 1,784, Susangerd 51,431, Tashan 4,281, Torkalaki 5,688, Veys 15,312, and Zahreh 1,192.

Politics

Khuzestan is ethnically diverse, home to many different ethnic groups. This has a bearing on Khuzestan's electoral politics, with ethnic minority rights playing a significant role in the province's political culture. The province's geographical location bordering Iraq and its oil resources also make it a politically sensitive region, particularly given its history of foreign intervention, notably the Iraqi invasion of 1980.

Some ethnic groups complain over the distribution of the revenue generated by oil resources with claims that the central government is failing to invest profits from the oil industry in employment generation, post-war reconstruction and welfare projects. Low human development indicators among local Khuzestanis are contrasted with the wealth generation of the local oil industry. Minority rights are frequently identified with strategic concerns, with ethnic unrest perceived by the Iranian government as being generated by foreign governments to undermine the country's oil industry and its internal stability. The politics of Khuzestan therefore have international significance and go beyond the realm of electoral politics.

According to Jane's Information Group, "Most Iranian Arabs seek their constitutionally guaranteed rights and do not have a separatist agenda. … While it may be true that some Arab activists are separatists, most see themselves as Iranians first and declare their commitment to the state's territorial integrity."

People and culture 

According to the 1996 census, the province had an estimated population of 3.7 million people, of which approximately 62.5% were in the urban centres, 36.5% were rural dwellers and the remaining 1% were non-residents. According to the most recent census taken in 2016, the province had 4,710,509 inhabitants.

Khuzestan is inhabited by many different ethnic groups; the population of Khuzestan consists of Persians, Arabs, Bakhtiaris, Lurs, Qashqai people of the Afshar tribe, Mandaeans and Armenians.

In literature 
Khuzestan has long been the subject of many a writer and poet of Persia, banking on its ample sugar production to use the term as allegory for sweetness. Some popular verses are:

"Her lips aflow with sweet sugar,
The sweet sugar that aflows in Khuzestan."
Nizami

"Your graceful figure like the cypress in Kashmar,
Your sweet lips like the sugar of Khuzestan."
Nizari Qohistani

"So Sām hath not need ride afar
from Ahvaz up to Qandehar."
Ferdosi

Languages 
Apart from Persian languages, other languages and dialects are also spoken in Khuzestan. For instance, a portion of Khuzestan's populace speaks Arabic (Khuzestani Arabic). Another part of Khuzestanis speak in Bakhtiari dialect.

Traditions and religion 

The people of Khuzestan are predominantly Shia Muslims, with small Sunni Muslim, Jewish, Christian and Mandean minorities. Khuzestanis are also very well regarded for their hospitality and generosity.

Cuisine 

Seafood is the most important part of Khuzestani cuisine, but many other dishes are also featured. The most popular Khuzestani dish is Ghalyeh Mahi, a fish dish that is prepared with heavy spices, onions and cilantro. The fish used in the dish is locally known as mahi soboor (shad fish), a species of fish found in the Persian Gulf. Other provincial specialties include Ghalyeh Meygu ("shrimp casserole"), ashe-mohshala (a Khorramshahri breakfast stew), sær shir (a Dezfuli breakfast of heavy cream), hælim (a Shushtari breakfast of wheatmeal with shredded lamb), and kohbbeh (a deep-fried rice cake with ground beef filling and other spices of Arabic origin, a variant on Levantine kibbeh).

Historical figures 
Many scientists, philosophers, and poets have come from Khuzestan, including Abu Nuwas, Abdollah ibn-Meymun Ahvazi, the astronomer Nowbækht-e Ahvazi and his sons as well as Jorjis, the son of Bakhtshua Gondishapuri, Ibn Sakit, Da'bal-e Khazai and Sheikh Mortedha Ansari, a prominent Shi'a scholar from Dezful.

Economy 

Khuzestan is the major oil-producing region of Iran, and as such is one of the wealthiest provinces in Iran. Khuzestan ranks third among Iran's provinces in GDP.

In 2005, Iran's government announced it was planning the country's second nuclear reactor to be built in Khuzestan province. The 360 MW reactor will be a light water PWR Reactor.

Khuzestan is also home to the Arvand Free Trade Zone. It is one of six economic Free Trade Zones in Iran. and the PETZONE (Petrochemical Special Economic Zone in Mahshahr).

Shipping 
Karun River is the only navigable river in Iran. The British, up until recent decades, after the discovery by Austen Henry Layard, transported their merchandise via Karun's waterways, passing through Ahvaz all the way up to Langar near Shushtar, and then sent by road to Masjed Soleimanthe site of their first oil wells in the Naftoon oil field. Karoun is capable of the sailing of fairly large ships as far up as Shushtar.

Karkheh, Jarrahi, Arvandrood, Handian, Shavoor, Bahmanshir (Bahman-Ardeshir), Maroon-Alaa', Dez, and many other rivers and water sources in the form of Khurs, lagoons, ponds, and marshes demonstrate the vastness of water resources in this region, and are the main reason for the variety of agricultural products developed in the area.

Agriculture 
The abundance of water and the fertility of the soil have made this region a rich and well-endowed land. The variety of agricultural products such as wheat, barley, oilseeds, rice, eucalyptus, medicinal herbs; the existence of many palm and citrus farms; the proximity of mountains suitable for raising olives, and of course sugar cane—from which Khuzestan takes its name—all show the great potential of this fertile region. In 2005, 51,000 hectares of land were planted with sugar canes, producing 350,000 tons of sugar. The abundance of water supplies, rivers, and dams, also have an influence on the fishery industries, which are prevalent in the area.

The Abadan island is an important area for the production of datepalms, but it has suffered from the invasion of the Iraqi army during the Iran–Iraq War. The palm groves are irrigated by tidal irrigation. At high tide, the waterlevel in the rivers is set up and the river flow enters the irrigation canals that have been dug from the river towards the inland plantations. At low tide, the canals drain the unused part of the water back to the river.

Industry 

There are several cane sugar mills in Khuzestan province, among them Haft Tepe and Karun Agro Industry near Shushtar.

The Karun 3 and 4, and Karkheh Dam, as well as the petroleum reserves provide Iran with national sources of revenue and energy. The petrochemical and steel industries, pipe making, the power stations that feed the national electricity grid, the chemical plants, and the large refineries are some of Iran's major industrial facilities.

Oil
The province is also home to Yadavaran Field, which is a major oil field in itself and part of the disputed Al-Fakkah Field. Khuzestan holds 80% of Iran's onshore oil reserves, and thus 57% of Iran's total oil reserves, making it indispensable to the Iranian economy.

Higher education 
 Khorramshahr University of Nautical Sciences and Technologies
 Institute for Higher Education ACECR Khouzestan
 Ahvaz Jundishapur University of Medical Sciences
 Petroleum University of Technology
 Shahid Chamran University of Ahvaz
 Shahid Chamran University – Dezful
 Abadan University of Medical Sciences
 Dezful University of Medical Sciences
 Rahnama Institute of Higher Education
 MehrArvand University
 PNU of Abadan
 Islamic Azad University, Ahvaz Branch
 Islamic Azad University – Science & Research Branch, Khuzestan
 Islamic Azad University of Abadan
 Islamic Azad University of Shushtar
 Islamic Azad University, Masjed Soleyman Branch
 Islamic Azad University of Abadan
 Islamic Azad University of Omidiyeh
 Islamic Azad University of Ahvaz
 Islamic Azad University of Behbahan
 Islamic Azad University of Izeh
 Islamic Azad University, Mahshahr Branch
 Amirkabir University of Technology, Mahshahr campus
 Ramin Agriculture and Natural Resources University of Khuzestan
 Payame Noor University of Ahvaz
 Amiralmoemenin University

Attractions of Khuzestan 
Iran National Heritage Organization lists 140 sites of historical and cultural significance in Khuzestan, reflecting the fact that the province was once the seat of Iran's most ancient empire.

Some of the more popular sites of attraction include:

 Choqa Zanbil: The seat of the Elamite Empire, this ziggurat is a magnificent five-story temple that is one of the greatest ancient monuments in the Middle-East today. The monolith, with its labyrinthine walls made of thousands of large bricks with Elamite inscription, manifest the sheer antiquity of the shrine. The temple was religiously sacred and built in the honor of Inshushinak, the protector deity of the city of Susa.
 Shush-Daniel: Burial site of the Jewish prophet Daniel. He is said to have died in Susa on his way to Jerusalem upon the order of Darius. The grave of Ya'qub bin Laith as-Saffar, who rose against the oppression of the Umayyad Caliphate, is also located nearby.
 Dezful (Dezh-pol), whose name is taken from a bridge (pol) over the Dez river having 12 spans built by the order of Shapur I. This is the same bridge that was called "Andamesh Bridge" by historians such as Istakhri who says the city of Andimeshk takes its name from this bridge. Muqaddasi called it "The City of the Bridge."
 Shushtar, Home to the famous Shushtar Watermills and one of the oldest fortress cities in Iran, known as the "City of Forty Elders" in local dialect. In and around Shushtar, there are many displays of ancient hydraulic engineering. There are also the Band Mizan and Band Qeysar, 2000-year-old dams on the Karoun river and the famous Shadervan Bridge which is over 2000 years old. The Friday Mosque of Shushtar was built by the Abbasids. The mosque, which features "Roman" arches, has 54 pillars and balconies.
 Izeh, or Izaj, was one of the main targets of the invading Islamic army in their conquest of Persia. Kharezad Bridge, one of the strangest bridges of the world, was situated in this city and was named after Ardeshir Babakan's mother. It is built over cast pillars of lead each 104 meters high. Ibn Battuta, who visited the city in the 14th century, refers to many monasteries, caravanserais, aqueducts, schools, and fortresses in the town. The brass statue of The Parthian Man, kept at the National Museum of Iran, is from here.
 Masjed Soleiman, another ancient town, has ancient fire altars and temples such as Sar-masjed and Bard-neshondeh. It is also the winter's resting area of the Bakhtiari tribe, and where William Knox D'Arcy dug Iran's first oil well.
 Abadan is said to be where the tomb of Elijah, the long lived Hebrew prophet is.
 Iwan of Hermes, and Iwan of Karkheh, two enigmatic ruins north of Susa.

Prominent people 
 Antiochus III the Great, 6th ruler of the Seleucid Empire
 Ayatollah Haj Muhammmad-Hassan Jazayeri, religious leader
 Mohammad Ali Mousavi Jazayeri, previous Wali-Faqih representative, Ahwaz Friday Imam
 Siavash Shams, famous Persian pop singer, songwriter and record producer
 Mehrangiz Kar, feminist lawyer and human rights activist
 Ezzat Negahban, Patriarch of the Iranian modern archaeology
 Siavash Ghomeyshi, singer, songwriter and composer
 Kaiser Aminpour, famous poet
 Hamid Dabashi, intellectual historian, cultural and literary critic
 Patrick Monahan, Irish comedian
 Parviz Abnar, sound recordist
 Saeed Abdevali, wrestler
 Nasser Taghvaee, director, photographer
 Parviz Dehdari, well-known footballer
 Mohsen Chavoshi, pop singer
 Bizhan Emkanian, actor
 Hamed Haddadi, NBA athlete
 Ali Shamkhani, Iran's minister of defense (1997–2005), Secretary of the Supreme National Security Council
 Masoud Shojaei, national football star
 Hossein Kaebi, national football star
 Jalal Kameli Mofrad, national football player
 Iman Mobali, national football star
 Ahmad Mahmoud, novelist
 Mohammad Reza Eskandari, Iran's minister of agriculture (2017–2021)
 Mohsen Rezaee, Secretary of Iran's powerful Expediency Discernment Council until 2021
 Abu Nuwas, a well-known poet
 Majusi, famous physician
 Naubakht, astronomer
 Seyyed Nematollah Jazayeri, Shia Islam scholar
 Ali Hashemi, commander in Iran–Iraq War

See also

References

External links 

  (Bibliography)

 
Provinces of Iran
Iran–Iraq War
Arabic-speaking countries and territories